William Dunham may refer to:
"By" Dunham (William D. Dunham), American songwriter and film producer
William Dunham (mathematician) (born 1947), American writer
William D. Dunham (1920–1990), United States Air Force general 
William Riley Dunham (1856–1921), member of the Indiana General Assembly